Covellite (also known as covelline) is a rare copper sulfide mineral with the formula CuS. This indigo blue mineral is commonly a secondary mineral in limited abundance and although it is not an important ore of copper itself, it is well known to mineral collectors.

The mineral is generally found in zones of secondary enrichment (supergene) of copper sulfide deposits. Commonly found as coatings on chalcocite, chalcopyrite, bornite, enargite, pyrite, and other sulfides, it often occurs as pseudomorphic replacements of other minerals. The first records are from Mount Vesuvius, formally named in 1832 after N. Covelli.

Composition
Covellite belongs to the binary copper sulfides group, which has the formula CuxSy and can have a wide-ranging copper/sulfur ratio, from 1:2 to 2:1 (Cu/S). However, this series is by no means continuous and the homogeneity range of covellite CuS is narrow. Materials rich in sulfur CuSx where x~ 1.1- 1.2 do exist, but they exhibit "superstructures", a modulation of the hexagonal ground plane of the structure spanning a number of adjacent unit cells. This indicates that several of covellite's special properties are the result of molecular structure at this level.

As described for copper monosulfide, the assignment of formal oxidation states to the atoms that constitute covellite is deceptive. The formula might seem to suggest the description Cu2+, S2−. In fact the atomic structure shows that copper and sulfur each adopt two different geometries. However photoelectron spectroscopy, magnetic, and electrical properties all indicate the absence of Cu2+ (d9) ions. In contrast to the oxide CuO, the material is not a magnetic semiconductor but a metallic conductor with weak Pauli-paramagnetism. Thus, the mineral is better described as consisting of Cu+ and S− rather than Cu2+ and S2−. Compared to pyrite with a non-closed shell of S− pairing to form S22−, there are only 2/3 of the sulfur atoms held. The other 1/3 remains unpaired and together with Cu atoms forms hexagonal layers reminiscent of the boron nitride (graphite structure). Thus, a description Cu+3S−S22− would seem appropriate with a delocalized hole in the valence band leading to metallic conductivity. Subsequent band structure calculations indicate however that the hole is more localized on the sulfur pairs than on the unpaired sulfur. This means that Cu+3S2−S2− with a mixed sulfur oxidation state -2 and -1/2 is more appropriate. Despite the extended formula of Cu+3S2−S2− from researchers in 1976 and 1993, others have come up with variations, such as Cu+4Cu2+2(S2)2S2.

Structure 
For a copper sulfide, covellite has a complicated lamellar structure, with alternating layers of CuS and Cu2S2 with copper atoms of trigonal planar (uncommon) and tetrahedral coordination respectively. The layers are connected by S-S bonds (based on Van der Waals forces) known as S2 dimers. The Cu2S2 layers only has one l/3 bond along the c-axis (perpendicular to layers), thus only one bond in that direction to create a perfect cleavage {0001}. The conductivity is greater across layers due to the partially filled 3p orbitals, facilitating electron mobility.

Formation

Naturally occurring 
Covellite is commonly found as a secondary copper mineral in deposits. Covellite is known to form in weathering environments in surficial deposits where copper is the primary sulfide. As a primary mineral, the formation of covellite is restricted to hydrothermal conditions, thus rarely found as such in copper ore deposits or as a volcanic sublimate.

Synthetic 
Covellite's unique crystal structure is related to its complex oxidative formation conditions, as seen when attempting to synthesize covellite. Its formation also depends on the state and history of the associated sulfides it was derived from. Experimental evidence shows ammonium metavanadate (NH4VO3) to be a potentially important catalyst for covellite's solid state transformation from other copper sulfides. Researchers discovered that covellite can also be produced in the lab under anaerobic conditions by sulfate reducing bacteria at a variety of temperatures. However, further research remains, because although the abundance of covellite may be high, the growth of its crystal size is actually inhibited by physical constraints of the bacteria. It has been experimentally demonstrated that the presence of ammonium vanadates is important in the solid state transformation of other copper sulfides to covellite crystals.

Occurrence

Covellite's occurrence is widespread around the world, with a significant number of localities in Central Europe, China, Australia, Western United States, and Argentina. Many are found close to orogenic belts, where orographic precipitation often plays a role in weathering. An example of primary mineral formation is in hydrothermal veins at depths of 1,150 m found in Silver Bow County, Montana. As a secondary mineral, covellite also forms as descending surface water in the supergene enrichment zone oxidizes and redeposits covellite on hypogene sulfides (pyrite and chalcopyrite) at the same locality. An unusual occurrence of covellite was found replacing organic debris in the red beds of New Mexico. 

Nicola Covelli (1790-1829), the discoverer of the mineral, was a professor of botany and chemistry though was interested in geology and volcanology, particularly Mount Vesuvius' eruptions. His studies of its lava led to the discovery of several unknown minerals including covellite.

Applications

Superconductors 
Covellite was the first identified naturally occurring superconductor. The framework of CuS3 /CuS2 allow for an electron excess that facilitate superconduction during particular states, with exceptionally low thermal loss. Material science is now aware of several of covellite's favorable properties and several researchers are intent on synthesizing covellite. Uses of covellite CuS superconductivity research can be seen in lithium batteries’ cathodes, ammonium gas sensors, and solar electric devices with metal chalcogenide thin films.

Lithium ion batteries

Research into alternate cathode material for lithium batteries often examines the complex variations in stoichiometry and tetrahedron layered structure of copper sulfides. Advantages include limited toxicity and low costs. The high electrical conductivity of covellite (10−3 S cm−1) and a high theoretical capacity (560 mAh g−1) with flat discharge curves when cycled versus Li+/Li has been determined to play critical roles for capacity. The variety of methods of formations is also a factor of the low costs. However, issues with cycle stability and kinetics have been limiting the progress of utilizing covellite in mainstream lithium batteries until future developments in its research.

Nanostructures 
The electron mobility and free hole density characteristics of covellite makes it an attractive choice for nanoplatelets and nanocrystals because they provide the structures the ability to vary in size. However, this ability can be limited by the plate-like structure all copper sulfides possess. Its anisotropic electrical conductivity has been experimentally proven to be greater within layers (i.e. perpendicular to c-axis). Researchers have shown that covellite nanoplatelets of approx. two nm thick, with one unit cell and two copper atoms layers, and diameters around 100 nm are ideal dimensions for electrocatalysts in oxygen reduction reactions (ORR). The basal planes experience preferential oxygen adsorption and larger surface area facilitates electron transfer. In contrast, with ambient conditions, nanoplatelets of dimensions of four nm width and greater than 30 nm diameter have been experimentally synthesized with less cost and energy. Conversely, localized surface plasmon resonances observed in covellite nanoparticles have recently been linked to the stoichiometry-dependent band gap key for nanocrystals. Thus, future chemical sensing devices, electronics, and others instruments are being explored with the use of nanostructures with covellite CuS.

See also

List of minerals
List of minerals named after people

References 

Copper ores
Sulfide minerals
Hexagonal minerals
Minerals in space group 194